Ruslan Melziddinov  (born 26 March 1985) is an Uzbekistani professional footballer who currently plays for FC Andijon as a midfielder.

Career
Melziddinov started his career at Neftchi Farg'ona in 2007. In 2009, he joined Bunyodkor and played 4 seasons for the club. After playing one year in Kazakhstan Premier League at Zhetysu in 2013 he moved back to his former club Neftchi Fergana. In 2015, he joined to Iranian club Naft Masjed Soleyman.

International
He has made appearances for the Uzbekistan national football team, including a match in the 2010 FIFA World Cup qualifying round.

Honours
Bunyodkor
 Uzbek League (3): 2009, 2010, 2011
 Uzbek League runner-up (1): 2012
 Uzbek Cup (1): 2012
 AFC Champions League semifinal: 2012

References

External links

Ruslan Melziddinov at Footballdatabase

1985 births
Living people
Uzbekistani footballers
Uzbekistan international footballers
Uzbekistani expatriate footballers
Uzbekistan Super League players
Kazakhstan Premier League players
Persian Gulf Pro League players
FC Bunyodkor players
FC Zhetysu players
Naft Masjed Soleyman F.C. players
Buxoro FK players
FC Shurtan Guzar players
Expatriate footballers in Kazakhstan
Expatriate footballers in Iran
Uzbekistani expatriate sportspeople in Kazakhstan
Uzbekistani expatriate sportspeople in Iran
Association football midfielders